Asii Kleist Berthelsen (born 26 January 2004) is a footballer who plays as a forward for Sundby BK. Born in Greenland, she is a Denmark youth international.

Career

In 2018 and 2019, Berthelsen won the Greenland Football Championship with GSS Nuuk. In both years she was top scorer of the tournament. She scored a hat trick in the 2018 finale at only 14 years old.

In 2020, Berthelsen signed for Danish top flight side Fortuna Hjørring. In 2022, she signed for Sundby in Denmark.

References

External links

 

2004 births
Women's association football forwards
Greenlandic emigrants to Denmark
Danish women's footballers
Elitedivisionen players
Greenlandic footballers
Fortuna Hjørring players
Living people